Dąbrówka  is a village in the administrative district of Gmina Borzytuchom, within Bytów County, Pomeranian Voivodeship, in northern Poland.

Prior to 1945 it was in Germany.

The village has a population of 525.

References

Villages in Bytów County